Kintampo District is a former district that was located in Brong-Ahafo Region (now currently in Bono East Region), Ghana. Originally created as an ordinary district assembly on 10 March 1989. However on 12 November 2003 (effectively 17 February 2004), it was split off into two new districts: Kintampo North District (which it was elevated to municipal district assembly status on 1 November 2007 (effectively 29 February 2008); capital: Kintampo) and Kintampo South District (capital: Jema). The district assembly was located in the southern part of Brong-Ahafo Region (now western part of Bono East Region) and had Kintampo as its capital town.

Sources
 
 District: Kintampo District
 19 New Districts Created, November 20, 2003.

References

2003 disestablishments in Ghana

Brong-Ahafo Region

Former districts of Ghana